Triveni is a rural municipality in Salyan District in the Karnali Province of western-central Nepal. At the time of the 1991 Nepal census it had a population of 3789 people living in 710 individual households.

Demographics
At the time of the 2011 Nepal census, Triveni Rural Municipality had a population of 16,647. Of these, 99.4% spoke Nepali, 0.3% Magar, 0.2% Urdu and 0.1% Newar as their first language.

In terms of ethnicity/caste, 54.7% were Chhetri, 26.7% Magar, 7.8% Kami, 3.3% Sanyasi/Dasnami, 2.1% Sarki, 2.0% Damai/Dholi,  1.3% Hill Brahmin, 0.9% Newar, 0.6% Thakuri and 0.6% others.

In terms of religion, 97.3% were Hindu, 1.8% Christian, 0.5% Buddhist and 0.4% Muslim.

References

External links
UN map of the municipalities of Salyan District

Populated places in Salyan District, Nepal
Rural municipalities of Nepal established in 2017
Rural municipalities in Karnali Province